The Spähpanzer Ru 251 is a German light tank based on the Kanonenjagdpanzer tank destroyer. It was proposed to replace the M41 Walker Bulldog.

History
The Ru 251 was one of the projects created by the Bundeswehr during the Cold War. In this connection, a new project began—the Europanzer, which led to the creation of the Leopard 1 for the West Germany or the AMX-30 for France.

In the early 1960s, the Bundeswehr still used American M41s as reconnaissance tanks. In 1960, a program was launched to develop a new light reconnaissance tank. Prototypes were built in 1963 and 1964.

Design
The Ru 251 is based on the Kanonenjagdpanzer tank destroyer and uses the same 90 mm Rheinmetall BK 90/L40 main cannon.

As a light reconnaissance tank, the Ru 251 is not used for intense combat, due to its light armor. The Ru 251's 20mm of armor can easily stop large caliber machine gun bursts, but becomes very vulnerable to higher caliber fire. The Ru 251 was designed as a light reconnaissance tank, to move quickly and stealthily and attack targets of opportunity, before repositioning itself using its high mobility: Any excess armor would hamper the speed of the tank.

The Ru 251 had remarkable mobility and firepower with its 650 hp Daimler-Benz MB 837 A engine and its Rheinmetall BK 90/L40 90mm cannon, but had no significant anti-tank shell protection. In 1964, the Ru 251 prototype underwent intensive operational trials, but at the same time the Leopard 1 main battle tank with its 105 mm cannon was prepared for series production.

See also
Spähpanzer SP I.C.

References

Light tanks of Germany
Cold War tanks of Germany
Light tanks of the Cold War